Alistair McLeod Stewart (2 October 1905 – 3 April 1970) was a Co-operative Commonwealth Federation member of the House of Commons of Canada. He was born in Buckhaven, Scotland and became a chartered accountant by career.

He was first elected at the Winnipeg North riding in the 1945 general election then re-elected for successive terms in 1949, 1953 and 1957. After his final federal term, the 23rd Canadian Parliament, he was defeated at Winnipeg North by Murray Smith of the Progressive Conservative party. Stewart made one further unsuccessful attempt to win a Parliamentary seat in the 1963 election at Winnipeg South Centre as a New Democratic Party candidate.

External links
 

1905 births
1970 deaths
Canadian accountants
Co-operative Commonwealth Federation MPs
20th-century Canadian politicians
Members of the House of Commons of Canada from Manitoba
Scottish expatriates in Canada